Košarkaški klub Varda (Serbian Cyrillic: Кошаркашки клуб Варда) is a professional basketball club from Višegrad, Bosnia and Herzegovina. The club currently participates in the Basketball Championship of Bosnia and Herzegovina.

Basketball teams in Bosnia and Herzegovina